Anton Freiherr von Hohberg und Buchwald (21 September 1885 – 2 July 1934) was a German officer in the Prussian Army and also in the Schutzstaffel (SS). He was murdered during the Night of the Long Knives.

Life
Hohberg was born in Wismar, Mecklenburg-Schwerin, and started a career as a Cavalry officer in the German Imperial Army. He served throughout World War I as a Rittmeister (captain) and was retired after 1918. After his dismissal, he went to his family's manor in Dulzen near Preussisch Eylau, East Prussia, where he started to work as a farmer. In 1909 he married Gertrud von Rheinbaben (1888–1949), daughter of Prussian Minister of Interior and Finances , but divorced in 1912 after a duel with Horst von Blumenthal, whom she then married. Around 1930 he joined the National Socialist German Workers' Party and was temporarily a member of the staff of East Prussian SS leader Erich von dem Bach–Zelewski, but came into personal conflicts with him.

On 14 May 1934, Hohberg was dismissed as SS–Oberabschnittsreiterführer (regional SS Cavalry leader) with a rank of SS-Obersturmführer (first lieutenant). During the Night of the Long Knives, von dem Bach gave the order to kill Hohberg. Most probably on 2 July 1934, Hohberg was shot in his manor house in Dulzen by SS-Scharführer Zummach (von dem Bach's chauffeur) and SS-Obersturmführer Carl Reinhard. Hohberg was one of the few SS-members, and probably the highest-ranking one, killed in the Röhm-Putsch.

Aftermath
Von dem Bach-Zelewski was a high-ranking SS-officer throughout World War II. On 16 January 1961, he was sentenced to four and a half years imprisonment by a West German court for the Hohberg murder. He died in prison in 1972.

Notes

References
Alfred Gerigk: Deutschland und das Weltgeschehen, 1961, p. 285 
Bernt Engelmann: , 1975, p. 328 
Heinz Höhne: Der Orden unter dem Totenkopf. Die Geschichte der SS, 1967, p. 115 

1885 births
1934 deaths
Barons of Germany
German Army personnel of World War I
People from Wismar
People from the Grand Duchy of Mecklenburg-Schwerin
SS-Obersturmführer
Victims of the Night of the Long Knives
People from Mecklenburg-Western Pomerania executed by Nazi Germany
German people executed by Nazi Germany
Nazis executed by Nazi Germany
Nazis executed by firearm
People executed by Nazi Germany by firearm